A list of films produced in the Soviet Union in 1928 (see 1928 in film).

1928

See also
 1928 in the Soviet Union

References

External links
 Soviet films of 1928 at the Internet Movie Database

1928
Soviet
Films